Vitória Cristina Silva Rosa (born 12 January 1996) is a Brazilian sprinter. South American record holder for the 200m (outdoor) and 60m (indoor).

She competed in the 200 metres at the 2015 World Championships in Athletics in Beijing without advancing from the first round. In June 2021, she qualified to represent Brazil at the 2020 Summer Olympics.

On 18 March 2022, in the 2022 World Athletics Indoor Championships semifinals. she broke the South American record in the Women's 60 metres with a time of 7.14. She finished 8th in the final, the best result in Brazil's history in this competition at the World Athletics Indoor Championships.

On 19 July 2022, in the 2022 World Athletics Championships semifinals. she broke the South American record in the Women's 200 metres with a time of 22.47. She finished 12th in the semifinals, almost equaling the best Brazilian position in the race's history (11th place).

Personal bests
100 m: 11.03 s (wind: +0.3 m/s) – Guadalajara, Spain, 6 Jul 2018
200 m: 22.47 s (wind: +1.4 m/s) – Eugene, USA, 19 Jul 2022
: 42.11 s – Ostrava, Czech Republic, 8 Sep 2018

Indoor

60 m: 7.14 s – Belgrade, Serbia, 18 Mar 2022

Source:

International competitions

1Did not finish in the final

2Out of competition performance

References

External links
 

1996 births
Living people
Brazilian female sprinters
World Athletics Championships athletes for Brazil
Athletes (track and field) at the 2015 Pan American Games
Athletes (track and field) at the 2019 Pan American Games
Place of birth missing (living people)
Pan American Games athletes for Brazil
Athletes (track and field) at the 2016 Summer Olympics
Olympic athletes of Brazil
South American Games gold medalists for Brazil
South American Games bronze medalists for Brazil
South American Games medalists in athletics
Athletes (track and field) at the 2018 South American Games
Pan American Games gold medalists for Brazil
Pan American Games silver medalists for Brazil
Pan American Games bronze medalists for Brazil
Pan American Games medalists in athletics (track and field)
South American Championships in Athletics winners
IAAF Continental Cup winners
Competitors at the 2019 Summer Universiade
Medalists at the 2019 Pan American Games
Ibero-American Championships in Athletics winners
South American Games gold medalists in athletics
Troféu Brasil de Atletismo winners
Athletes (track and field) at the 2020 Summer Olympics
Sportspeople from Rio de Janeiro (city)
Olympic female sprinters
20th-century Brazilian women
21st-century Brazilian women